Berlinde De Bruyckere (born 1964) is a Belgian contemporary artist.

De Bruyckere specializes in sculpture in various media including wax, wood, wool, horse skin and hair, though she also works in watercolour, gouache, and since the early 1990s many of her major works have featured structures involving blankets. Their use is symbolic both of warmth and shelter, and of the  vulnerable circumstances such as wars that make people seek such shelter.

In 2000, De Bruyckere's work with five dead horses, In Flanders Fields, a commentary on World War I, was exhibited at the In Flanders Fields Museum in Ypres. In 2006, her work was included in the 4th Berlin Biennial for Contemporary Art and exhibited in a two-artist show at the Kunsthalle Düsseldorf. At the 2013 Venice Biennale, her sculptures were shown in the Belgian Pavilion.

De Bruyckere solo exhibitions include La Maison Rouge, Fondation Antoine de Galbert, Paris (2005); the De Pont Museum of Contemporary Art, Tilburg (2005); The Mystery of the Body: Berlinde De Bruyckere in Dialogue with Lucas Cranach and Pier Paolo Pasonli, the Kunstmuseum Bern; and We are all Flesh at the Australian Centre for Contemporary Art, Melbourne (2012).

In 2015 she received an honorary doctorate from Ghent University.

References

1964 births
Living people
20th-century Belgian sculptors
21st-century Belgian sculptors
20th-century Belgian women artists
21st-century Belgian women artists
Belgian women sculptors